Karen Avagyan (born 12 May 1999) is an Armenian weightlifter. In 2021, he won the gold medal in the men's 89 kg event at the 2021 European Weightlifting Championships held in Moscow, Russia.

In 2019, he won the gold medal in the men's junior 89kg event at the 2019 European Junior & U23 Weightlifting Championships in Bucharest, Romania. At the 2021 European Junior & U23 Weightlifting Championships in Rovaniemi, Finland, he also won the gold medal in his event.

References

External links 
 

Living people
1999 births
Place of birth missing (living people)
Armenian male weightlifters
European Weightlifting Championships medalists
21st-century Armenian people